Branko Despot (born July 6, 1942, Zagreb) is Croatian philosopher.

He is the son of Miroslava Despot, a prominent economic and cultural historian. After finishing gymnasium in Zagreb in 1961, he graduated in philosophy and Ancient Greek in 1965 at the Faculty of Philosophy in Zagreb, where he also received his PhD in 1975 with a thesis on the philosophy of Vladimir Dvorniković. He worked as a researcher at the Institute of Philosophy since 1968, and since 1971 at the Faculty of Philosophy in Zagreb, at first as an assistant, as a docent (1979–84) and then as a professor at the Chair of History of Philosophy at the Department of Philosophy. He is a member of the 
Croatian Writers' Association and PEN International.

His research covers history of philosophy, Ancient Greek philosophy, German classical and contemporary philosophy as well as Croatian contemporary thought.

He published treatises and papers in journals and periodicals such as Vidici (1968), Filosofija (1969–70), Praxis (1969–71), Problemi (1969–90), Kamov (1970), Kolo (1970), Pitanja (1971), Dijalog (1977), Polja (1978), Gordogan (1979, 1982, 1983, 1985), Filozofska istraživanja (1984, 1986, 1988), Godišnjak za povijest filozofije (1984, 1990), Synthesis philosophica (1986) and others.

He published two monographs that deal with the history of philosophy of Đuro Arnold and Vladimir Dvorniković. He translated from German works such as Nicolai Hartmann's Osnovne crte jedne metafizike spoznaje  (Zagreb, 1976), Eugen Fink's Nietzscheova filozofija (Zagreb 1981) and Adam Schaff's Komunistički pokret na raspuću (Zagreb 1985).

He is a regular member of the Croatian Academy of Sciences and Arts since 2010.

Works
 Filozofija Gjure Arnolda, 1970, Zagreb
  Vidokrug apsoluta. Prilog indiskutabilnoj dijagnostici nihilizma., 19721, 19892, 19922
 Filozofiranje Vladimira Dvornikovića, 1975, Zagreb
 Logički fragmenti, 1978, Zagreb
 Filozofski dnevnik, 1982, Zagreb
 Uvod u filozofiju, 1988, Zagreb
 Sitnice, 1991, Zagreb
 Filozofiranje?, 1995
 Filozofija kao sistem?, 1999
 Filozofija?, 2000,
 Filozofijom kroz nefilozofiju, 2010

References

20th-century Croatian philosophers
Historians of philosophy
Scholars of contemporary philosophy
Scholars of ancient Greek philosophy
Academic staff of the University of Zagreb
1942 births
Living people
Members of the Croatian Academy of Sciences and Arts